NSDP may refer to:

Irish Nazi Party (NSDP-AO), see Adolf Mahr
National Secular Democratic Party, a political party in Lebanon
National Solidarity and Development Party, a political organization in Burma
National Space Development Program (Philippines)
 Net state domestic product, used in relation to calculate the GDP per capita in India
Netgear Switch Discovery Protocol, a vendor-specific management protocol
Nevada State Democratic Party, an affiliate of the Nevada Democratic Party
New Social Democratic Party, in the Republic of North Macedonia
Nationwide Social Democratic Party, in the Republic of Kazakhstan

See also
NSDAP, or Nazi Party